Migra or La migra may refer to:

 "Migra", a song by Carlos Santana included on Supernatural (Santana album)
 "La Migra", a song by the extreme metal band Brujeria off of their 1995 album Raza Odiada
 "La migra", a slang term for U.S. Immigration and Customs Enforcement or other immigration law enforcement agencies